Taulant Ragip Xhaka (born 28 March 1991) is a professional footballer who plays as a defensive midfielder for Swiss Super League club Basel. Born in Switzerland, he represented the Albania national team.

Early life
Xhaka was born in Basel, Switzerland, to Albanian parents originally from Kosovo. He is the elder brother of Granit Xhaka, who is a professional footballer who plays for Arsenal and the Switzerland national team. The family moved from Yugoslavia to Switzerland in 1990, where both brothers were born.

Club career

Early years
Taulant Xhaka started playing football at the age of 6 and entered at FC Concordia Basel in 2000 before moving along with his brother to FC Basel two years later. He played for various FC Basel youth teams and from 2008 became a regular member of the under-21 team for two years in the Swiss 1. Liga playing overall 37 games, scoring six goals.

Basel
At the beginning of the 2010–11 season, he and his brother Granit moved up into the first team squad where he began playing as a defender. He made his first team debut on 19 September 2010 in the 5–0 Swiss Cup win against FC Mendrisio-Stabio. He made his Super League debut on 27 February 2011 in the 1–0 away win against Luzern. At the end of the season, the team won the Super League title, Xhaka's first silverware with the club.

In the next season, Xhaka scored his first Basel goal on 10 September during the 4–0 away league win against Servette, where he came on as a substitute. On 27 September, he made his UEFA Champions League debut as a substitute in the 3–3 away draw against Manchester United at Old Trafford.

Loan to Grasshoppers
On 18 January 2012, it was announced Xhaka was sent on loan to Grasshoppers to gain first-team playing experience. He made his Grasshoppers debut on 12 February during the 2–0 away defeat to Zürich, and until the end of the season he established himself in the starting lineup, making 13 appearances during the second part of 2011–12 season. He also spent the 2012–13 season on loan to the Grasshoppers. But for the following season Basel recalled him into their squad.

Return to Basel

Basel coach Murat Yakin recalled Xhaka to the Basel squad as defensive midfielder. During the 2013–14 season, he established himself in the starting lineup, making 23 league appearances and scoring two goals en route to winning his second league championship with Basel. He also made four cup appearances as the team reached in the final but was beaten 2–0 by Zürich after extra time. He was also an important instrument in team's European campaign, playing ten matches in the Champions League and five in the UEFA Europa League.

During the 2014–15 season, Xhaka further secured his place in the starting lineup, playing 29 matches in league, as Basel were crowned champions for the sixth time in a row. He scored his first goal of the season on 27 September in the 1–1 home draw against Thun. On 13 December, during the cup fixture against Sion, Xhaka suffered an injury which kept him sidelined until the January 2015.

On 9 January 2015, Xhaka extended his contract for a further three years, up until 30 June 2018. In February 2015, he was included in the 2014 Team of the Year by Swiss Football Association and was placed as right-defender. He became one of the three Albania international footballers who participated in the knockout stage of the Champions League for the first time in history, alongside Basel teammates Shkëlzen Gashi and Arlind Ajeti.

Under trainer Urs Fischer, Xhaka won the Swiss Super League championship at the end of the 2015–16 season and at the end of the 2016–17 Super League season for the sixth time. For the club this was the eighth title in a row and their 20th championship title in total. They also won the Swiss Cup for the 12th time, which meant they had won the double for the sixth time in club history.

Following the retirement of Matías Emilio Delgado at the start of the 2017–18 season, on 5 August 2017, Xhaka became vice-captain of the Basel team. On 18 October 2017, Xhaka scored his first UEFA Champions League goal during the 2017–18 UEFA Champions League group stage matchday 3 against CSKA Moscow in the VEB Arena helping Basel to take their second win.

Under trainer Marcel Koller, Basel won the Swiss Cup in the 2018–19 season. In the first round Basel beat FC Montlingen 3–0, in the second round Echallens Région 7–2 and in the round of 16 Winterthur 1–0. In the quarter finals Sion were defeated 4–2 after extra time and in the semi finals Zürich were defeated 3–1. All these games were played away from home. The final was held on the 19 May 2019 in the Stade de Suisse Wankdorf Bern against Thun. Striker Albian Ajeti scored the first goal, Fabian Frei the second for Basel, then Dejan Sorgić netted a goal for Thun, but the end result was 2–1 for Basel. Xhaka played in four of the cup games.

In the UEFA Europa League quarter-final match against Shakhtar Donetsk on 11 August 2020 Xhaka was injured and substituted out in the 60th minute. This was later diagnosed as a medial collateral ligament injury and eventually required an operation. Xhaka missed the entire 2020–21 season due to this and could not returned to team-trainings until June 2021.

International career

Switzerland
Xhaka begun his international career with Switzerland by playing with the under-17 side at the 2008 UEFA European Under-17 Championship. He played in all three matches as starter, unable to prevent the team's early elimination from the competition. In the next two years, Xhaka also featured with under-18 and the -19 teams.

His Swiss under-20 debut came on 6 September 2010 in a 2–3 loss to Germany at Stadion Breite. One year later, Xhaka earned his first under-21 cap in the 1–0 away win versus Georgia. He played his first match as starter in another match versus them which ended in a 5–0 win at Cornaredo Stadium. Overall, Xhaka played 41 matches for Switzerland youth squads.

Albania

2013: Changing teams
In May 2013, Xhaka expressed his wish to represent Albania senior team, adding that his choice of Albania was definitive. Later in October, he told the media that his choice to play for Albania was influenced by his younger brother Granit. On 18 December of the same year, he received Albanian citizenship, though he still required approval from FIFA in order to represent Albania internationally.

2014–16: First call-ups, UEFA Euro 2016
Xhaka received his first call-up by manager Gianni De Biasi for the friendly against Malta on 5 March 2014, but was forced to withdraw due to an injury suffered just three days before the match. He was invited again in May for three friendlies against Romania, Hungary and San Marino but suffered yet another injury which prolonged his debut. On 25 June, Xhaka received approval from FIFA allowing him to represent Albania in international official matches.

Xhaka was fully fit ahead of UEFA Euro 2016 qualifying campaign where he received a call-up for the opening match against Portugal on 7 September 2014. He started the match and played full-90 minutes, producing a great performance and helping Albania to an empathic 1–0 win at Estádio Municipal de Aveiro. His performance earned praise from the media, as he was included in the Team of the Week. Later on 14 October, Xhaka playing in the third qualifying match against Serbia; he was heavily involved in the riots that happened during the match, notably taking the flag Greater Albania along with Andi Lila from the Serbian player Stefan Mitrović which started a massive brawl. The match was eventually postponed due to Serbian fans launching flares onto the pitch. He along with other Albanian players where attacked by Serbian hooligans who came onto the pitch with chairs and other objects. Initially, UEFA awarded Serbia with a 3–0 win, but were deducted three points, leading both Serbia and Albania appeals to the Court of Arbitration for Sport, who on 10 July 2015, awarded Albania with a 3–0 victory and Serbia were still deducted three points. Days after the match, he along with Lorik Cana were declared citizens of honour from the mayor of the city of Mitrovica, Kosovo, for the bravery shown in protecting national symbols.

Albania eventually made their way to their UEFA European Championship appearance after defeating Armenia 3–0 in the last match in which played full-90 minutes. On 21 May 2016, Xhaka was named in Albania's preliminary 27-man squad for the final stages of Euro 2016, and in Albania's final 23-man Euro 2016 squad, announced on 31 May.

In Albania's opening match, against Switzerland, Xhaka competed against his brother Granit, becoming the first pair of brothers to play against each other in the entire UEFA European Championship history. At that day, their mother watched from the crowd with a T-shirt combining both nations' flags. Switzerland defeated Albania 1–0. In the second match against hosts France, Xhaka played in the final 16 minutes as a replacement for Burim Kukeli as Albania lost 2–0 with both goals conceded in the last minutes. He did not play in the last group match against Romania in which Albania won 1–0 thanks to a header by Armando Sadiku. It was Albania's first win over Romania since 1948. Albania finished the group in the third position with three points and with a goal difference −2, and was ranked last in the third-placed teams, which eventually eliminated them.

2017–2019: Controversies and UEFA Nations League
Xhaka played only four matches in the 2018 FIFA World Cup qualification in which Albania was placed in Group G, finishing in third place which was still a record. In March 2017, following the 2–0 away loss to Italy in which Xhaka didn't play, he left the team and ahead of the friendly against Bosnia and Herzegovina, announcing via a Facebook status that he would not be part of the team while Gianni De Biasi remains in charge. He also threw several accusations towards the coach in the next weeks, saying that De Biasi is Italian, and that his interest are only the money, not the national team.

De Biasi told the media that he is willing to call Xhaka to the national team again if he asks for public forgiveness, a request which Xhaka refused. De Biasi left Albania in June 2017, and was replaced by fellow countryman Cristian Panucci, who in August left Xhaka out again for the next qualifying matches. He returned to the national team in October 2017 for the final two qualifying matches against Spain and Italy. He played his first match in 11 months against Spain which ended in a 3–0 away loss.

Xhaka scored his first international goal in his 22nd appearance in Albania's first ever match in UEFA Nations League against Israel, netting with a right shot outside the penalty area in the second half. His goal gave Albania a 1–0 win at Elbasan Arena and the first three points in 2018–19 UEFA Nations League C's Group 1.

2021: Retirement
On 15 November 2021, Xhaka announced his retirement from international football, citing his injuries and personal stuff as the reasons behind his decision. He played his last match for Albania on 7 September, exactly five years after his debut. He totaled 31 appearances and one goal.

Personal life
On 7 January 2018, Xhaka was engaged to his long-time Albanian girlfriend, Arbnora Nuredini; they married that year. He is the elder brother of Granit Xhaka.

Career statistics

Club

International

International goals
Scores and results list Albania's goal tally first.

Honours

Basel
 Swiss Super League: 2010–11, 2013–14, 2014–15, 2015–16, 2016–17
 Swiss Cup: 2016–17, 2018–19

Grasshopper
 Swiss Cup: 2012–13

Basel U18
 U18 Swiss Cup: 2007–08

References

External links

 FSHF profile
 
 
 FC Basel official profile 
 Profile season 2016/17 on the Swiss Football League homepage 

1991 births
Living people
Swiss people of Kosovan descent
Swiss people of Albanian descent
Sportspeople of Albanian descent
Footballers from Basel
Association football defenders
Association football midfielders
Swiss men's footballers
Albanian footballers
FC Basel players
Grasshopper Club Zürich players
Swiss Super League players
Switzerland youth international footballers
Switzerland under-21 international footballers
Albania international footballers
UEFA Euro 2016 players